Raynard Roets (born 9 April 2001) is a South African rugby union player for the  in the Currie Cup. His regular position is lock.

Roets was named in the  side for the 2022 Currie Cup Premier Division.

References

South African rugby union players
Living people
Rugby union locks
Blue Bulls players
2001 births
Bulls (rugby union) players
Golden Lions players